Front Row Club Issue 1 is a live Marillion CD recorded at Ludwigshalle, Dieburg, Germany, November 9, 1998, during the Radiation Tour.
It is the first release in the Front Row Club Releases series.

Track list
Disc 1
"A Few Words for the Dead" – 8:18
"Under the Sun" – 4:06
"Man of a Thousand Faces" – 4:15
"Mad" – 8:10
"Three Minute Boy" – 6:35
"80 Days" – 5:49
"Splintering Heart" – 6:55
"These Chains" – 4:56
"The Answering Machine" – 3:45
"Cannibal Surf Babe" – 5:54
"Gazpacho" – 5:05

Disc 2
"Cathedral Wall" – 6:31
"This Strange Engine" – 23:12
"Memory of Water (Big Beat Version)" – 8:01
"King" – 7:20

1998 live albums
Marillion live albums